Bachórz  ( Bakhir) is a village in the administrative district of Gmina Dynów, within Rzeszów County, Subcarpathian Voivodeship, in south-eastern Poland.

The village has a population of 1,214.

References

Villages in Rzeszów County